The third and final season of Kuroko's Basketball anime series is produced by Production I.G. It is based on the manga series of the same name written and illustrated by Tadatoshi Fujimaki. The third season premiered on January 10, 2015 and ended on June 30, 2015, with a total of 25 episodes.

The third season has 3 opening and 3 ending themes. This first opening is "Punky Funky Love" by GRANRODEO while the ending is "GLITTER DAYS" by Fo'xTails. The second opening is "ZERO" by Kenshō Ono while the ending theme is "Ambivalence" by SCREEN mode. The third opening theme is "Memories" by GRANRODEO while the ending theme is "Lantana" by OLDCODEX.

An original video animation, was included on the final volume of Kuroko's Basketball (Volume 9), which was released on December 24, 2015. On January 14, 2017, Crunchyroll later added the anime to their streaming service.

On October 19 2020, the SAG-AFTRA listed and approved an English dub for the series under the "Netflix Dubbing Agreement". The English-dubbed third season debuted on Netflix on September 18, 2021.


Episode list

References

Kuroko's Basketball episode lists
2015 Japanese television seasons